Emmanuel García Vaca (born 28 December 1989) is a Mexican professional footballer who plays as a left-back.

Career
On 8 December 2015, Tuzos de Pachuca announced that they had permanently signed 'Manny' from Veracruz.

Honours
Pachuca
Liga MX: Clausura 2016
CONCACAF Champions League: 2016–17

References

1989 births
Living people
Footballers from Michoacán
Mexican footballers
People from Zamora, Michoacán
La Piedad footballers
C.D. Veracruz footballers
Liga MX players
C.F. Pachuca players
Association football midfielders